The Vermenagna is a   long river in northwestern Italy (Piedmont).

Geography 
The Vermenagna is a tributary to the river Gesso, in the river Po basin. Its source is a small lake higher than 2000 m close to the Rocca dell'Abisso, not faraway from the Colle di Tenda; after Limonetto the  flows crosses the comunes of Limone Piemonte and Vernante, where it gets from the left bank its main tributary, the rio di Valle Grande, which collects the waters of the valley of Palanfrè (or ‘’Val Grande’’). Its course continues reaching Robilante and Roccavione; on the border between the latter comune with Borgo San Dalmazzo the Vermenagna ends in the  Gesso, at 610 of elevation. The course of the Vermenagna separates the Maritime Alps from the Ligurian Alps.

Main tributaries

Left side:
 rio di Valle Grande.
Right side:
 torrente Valleggia;
 rio Malandrè.

See also 

 Natural Park of Marguareis
 List of rivers of Italy

References

External links

Rivers of the Province of Cuneo
Rivers of Italy
Rivers of the Alps